KIMO Industrie-Elektronik GmbH is a German private limited company located in Erlangen southern part of Germany. Founded in 1989 the company develops, manufactures and sell solutions for electronic drive technology and power electronics. KIMO is known to have produced Motor soft starters and other motor control devices, holding patents in power electronics has given Braking chopper solutions for port cranes at Fort de France in Martinique

Product range 
The company manufactures drive solutions with power range from 0.25 kW up to 2000 kW. and from 110 V up to 690 V.

Products 
 Soft starter
 DC Injection Braking unit
 Voltage controller
 Braking chopper
 Variable frequency drive
 Regenerative frequency drives

References

Manufacturing companies of Germany
German brands
Electrical engineering companies of Germany
Companies based in Erlangen
Engineering companies of Germany